Adam Troy Dunn (born November 9, 1979), nicknamed "Big Donkey", is an American former professional baseball left fielder and first baseman. He played in Major League Baseball (MLB) for the Cincinnati Reds, Arizona Diamondbacks, Washington Nationals, Chicago White Sox, and Oakland Athletics. He is a two-time MLB All-Star.

Dunn batted left-handed and threw right-handed. He is tied for most opening day home runs at eight with Frank Robinson and Ken Griffey Jr., and on August 18, 2012, he became the 50th MLB player to hit 400 career home runs. He also ranked third on the all-time strikeout list at the time of his retirement, with 2,379, and fourth for the most Golden sombreros (at least four strikeouts in a game) at 19, tied with Bo Jackson. He also holds the American League record for most strikeouts in a season with 222, which he set in 2012.

Amateur career
Dunn was a standout quarterback at New Caney High School in Texas. After his graduation from high school, the Cincinnati Reds drafted Dunn in the second round (50th overall) of the 1998 Major League Baseball draft. Dunn had previously committed to play football for the University of Texas at Austin. The Reds and Dunn agreed to a deal which allowed him to play minor league baseball during the summer and return to Austin in August to prepare for football. Dunn redshirted his freshman season and served as a backup to Major Applewhite. When star recruit Chris Simms committed to Texas, Dunn was asked to move to the tight end position. As a result, he left the Longhorns to concentrate on baseball in 1999.

Professional career
Despite his high strikeout totals, Dunn exhibited good plate discipline. Throughout his career, he was among the major league leaders in number of pitches per at-bat. While his career batting average was .237, Dunn finished his career with an on-base percentage above .360. He was annually among the league leaders in both bases on balls and strikeouts. He finished his career with an at bats per home run ratio of 14.89, according to Baseball Reference, placing him 11th all-time.

Cincinnati Reds
Dunn made his MLB debut on July 20, 2001, and set a National League rookie record for the most home runs in a month by hitting 12 in August.

In 2002, Dunn had a career-high 128 walks and a .400 on-base percentage. During that same year, he was selected to the 2002 National League All-Star team. In that game, Dunn hit a ball to center field that was a few feet from being a game ending home run (the game famously ended in a tie). He also walked in his only other plate appearance.

Dunn's most productive season came in 2004, when he posted career highs in batting average (.266), home runs (46), runs (105), hits (151), slugging percentage (.569), and on-base plus slugging (OPS) (.957). On September 30, 2004, Dunn once again got his name in Major League Baseball's record book. That day, Dunn struck out three times against Chicago Cubs right-hander Mark Prior, raising his season total to 191 and surpassing Bobby Bonds' single season strikeout record of 189, set in 1970. He finished the season with 195 strikeouts. He held the record until Ryan Howard broke it on September 27, 2007. On August 10, 2004, Dunn hit the longest home run in the history of Great American Ball Park, a 535-foot blast to straightaway center that went over the batter's eye and bounced off Mehring Way into a section of the Ohio River that is considered part of Kentucky.

Dunn's 46 home runs in 2004 were the fourth most in Cincinnati Reds history. That year, he joined Hall of Fame second baseman Joe Morgan as the only Reds players to score 100 runs, drive in 100 runs, and draw 100 walks in a single season. Dunn repeated the feat the following season making him the only player in Reds history to do it more than once.

In 2003, he led all major league outfielders in errors, with 10. In 2004, he tied for the lead among all major league left fielders in errors, with eight.

In 2004, 2005, and 2006, he struck out 34.3%, 30.9%, and 34.6% of the time, respectively. In each season, his was the highest strikeout percentage in Major League Baseball. In 2008, he struck out 31.7% of the time.

In 2006, he led all major league outfielders in errors, with 12, and had the lowest fielding percentage among left fielders, at .960. Also in 2006, Dunn made Cincinnati headlines with one of the biggest home runs of his career, a walk-off grand slam to cap a 9-run rally to beat the Indians June 30.

During a lengthy rain delay on July 21, 2006, Dunn made a prank phone call from the clubhouse to Reds radio announcer Marty Brennaman. Brennaman was filling air time by taking calls from listeners, a segment he dubbed "The Banana Phone". Dunn, who identified himself as "Adam from Milwaukee" and spoke in a goofy voice, asked Brennaman if he thought Reds' first baseman Scott Hatteberg was a good player, then asked if the announcer was wearing a shirt. The clip went viral, and is frequently replayed on Cincinnati radio. In a 2012 poll, Reds fans voted the segment their all-time favorite "off-beat Marty" call.

On October 31, 2007, Dunn's $13 million option was picked up by the Reds, making him the highest-paid player on the team.

On June 29, 2008, Dunn won the Ohio Cup MVP when he went 6-for-20 in the six-game series, with 5 home runs and 10 RBI.

Both during his career with the Reds and since he has been close friends with Austin Kearns.

In 2018, he was named to the Cincinnati Reds Hall of Fame.

Arizona Diamondbacks
On August 11, 2008, Dunn was traded to the Arizona Diamondbacks for right-handed pitcher Dallas Buck and two other players to be named later. The two players were catcher Wilkin Castillo and pitcher Micah Owings.

In 2008, he walked 19.1% of the time, the highest percentage in major league baseball; however, he also struck out 164 times in 651 plate appearances. Defensively, he had the lowest fielding percentage of all starting major league left fielders, .968, and committed more errors (7) than any other NL left fielder.

Washington Nationals

On February 11, 2009, Dunn agreed to a two-year $20 million deal with the Washington Nationals. In his first game as a National, he hit a home run and had four RBIs. On July 4, 2009, he hit his 300th career home run. During the 2009 season, Dunn transitioned to first base.

On July 7, 2010, Dunn hit three home runs in a single game for the first time in his career as the Nationals beat the Padres 7–6. He hit a three-run homer and two solo homers to join Alfonso Soriano as the only Nationals players to accomplish the feat. On May 29, 2013, Ryan Zimmerman hit three home runs in a game, becoming the third Washington National to do so. On May 6, 2015, Bryce Harper hit three home runs in a game, becoming the fourth Washington National to do so.

Chicago White Sox
On December 2, 2010, Dunn agreed to a four-year, $56 million deal with the Chicago White Sox. On April 6, 2011 Dunn underwent an appendectomy which caused him to miss five games. Prior to the appendectomy, Dunn was hitting .286 with a home run and 5 RBIs. However, after returning, Dunn struggled drastically, leading to reduced playing time as the year proceeded. He ended the season with a .159 average, .292 on-base percentage, .277 slugging percentage, .569 OPS, and 177 strikeouts, hitting only 11 home runs and recording 42 RBI, putting together by far the worst season of his career. The 177 strikeouts set a new White Sox team record for most strikeouts in a season by a batter, beating the previous record of 175 held by Dave Nicholson. Dunn's 2011 campaign was by far the worst of any player in the majors, and had Dunn qualified for the batting title (A player must have 3.1 plate appearances for every team game played, for a total of 502, in order to qualify; Dunn only had 496 for the year), his .159 average would have been the lowest batting average by a qualified player since Bill Bergen hit .139 as a starter for the 1909 Brooklyn Superbas.

Through 2011, he led all active left fielders in career errors, totaling 60 errors.

Frustrated by his poor performance in 2011, Dunn pledged to change his offseason preparation so as to "not let this happen again." By the end of May 2012, Dunn surpassed his entire home run total from the year before and was leading the American League in walks.

In 2012, Dunn struck out in 36 straight games, a record for a position player until 2017, when Yankees rookie Aaron Judge struck out in 37 straight games.
On July 1, Dunn was elected by his peers to the 83rd All-Star Game in Kansas City, his second career All-Star selection and one of four White Sox selections on the season. On July 24, Dunn became the fourth left-handed White Sox player to hit 30 home runs in a season, joining Oscar Gamble, Robin Ventura and Jim Thome. He recorded his 1,000th RBI on August 13. In a game against the Kansas City Royals on August 18, Dunn hit his 35th home run of the season and 400th in his career when he connected on a two-run shot in the eighth inning, becoming the 50th MLB player to hit 400 career home runs. Dunn finished the 2012 season with a .204 batting average, 41 home runs, and 96 RBI. He also led the majors with walks (105) and strikeouts (222). He became only the 3rd player to join the 200 strikeout club and his number of strikeouts established a new American League record, falling just one short of the major league record set by Mark Reynolds in 2009.

On August 5, 2014, much to the delight of the remaining fans at U.S. Cellular Field and members of the White Sox dugout, Dunn pitched the top of the ninth inning during a demoralizing blowout loss of 16-0 to the Texas Rangers. Dunn's outing marked his first career pitching appearance and he didn't disappoint, as the power hitting DH landed his first pitch, a 78-mph fastball, for a called strike to Rangers shortstop Elvis Andrus. With Dunn taking the mound and Leury Garcia pitching earlier in the season on April 16, it marked the first time since 1979 that position players pitched in two games in the same season for the White Sox.

Oakland Athletics
The White Sox traded Dunn to the Oakland Athletics on August 31, 2014, in exchange for Nolan Sanburn. Hours after the trade was announced, Dunn announced he would "probably" retire after the 2014 season. On September 1, Dunn made his first plate appearance with Oakland and hit a two-run home run against the Seattle Mariners. He became the 12th player in Athletics history to hit a home run in his first at-bat with the organization. After a few productive games early on with the A's, Dunn's performance declined and became similar to his time with Chicago. In 25 games with Oakland, he batted .212 with a .316 on-base percentage, two home runs and 10 RBIs. Dunn is one of fourteen players to have played 2,000 games without making the postseason, as Dunn played in 2,001 games, which was the longest for any active player at the time of his retirement . On the last day of the season, the Athletics clinched the second AL Wild Card spot, which meant he was on a postseason roster for the first (and last) time. However, he did not make an appearance in the AL Wild Card Game, which ended with a 9–8 loss to the Kansas City Royals. Dunn confirmed his retirement after the game.

International career
On March 1, 2009, Dunn joined the United States team for the 2009 World Baseball Classic at the late request of coach Davey Johnson. In the March 7, 2009 first-round game against Canada in Toronto, he hit a two-run home run and batted in a run on a sacrifice fly play. On March 8, Dunn scored on a three-run triple by Chris Iannetta, and had a solo home run against Venezuela.

Playing style

Dunn came under criticism during his career for what some viewed as a lackadaisical effort in left field. When Dunn was a free agent in 2009, Toronto Blue Jays GM J. P. Ricciardi commented in response to a question about acquiring Dunn: "Do you know the guy doesn't really like baseball that much? Do you know the guy doesn't have a passion to play the game that much? How much do you know about the player? There's a reason why you're attracted to some players and there's a reason why you're not attracted to some players. I don't think you'd be very happy if we brought Adam Dunn here." Ricciardi later apologized for his comments. In 2008, Reds announcer Marty Brennaman criticized Dunn's lack of clutch hitting as well noting, "He homers; he doesn't drive in runs." Marty Brennaman said in 2007, "I think he was overweight last year. He walks to his position. He walks off the field. You see no energy whatsoever and that disappoints the heck out of me." However, Washington Nationals GM Mike Rizzo had this to say: "Dunn was the most misunderstood player I have heard about in recent memory. The way he was misconstrued [in Cincinnati] was almost unbelievable. He plays banged up. He'd go out there 162 games if you'd let him. He's the most consistent player in the game the last six years." Dunn was asked in 2012 about his hitting style and at times, prolonged slumps, responding, "When I'm going bad, I'm the worst player in the league. There's no arguing that. When I'm in that little funk that I get in, you know, every year for 'x' amount of times, I'm the worst in the league." Commenting about whether strikeouts were a concern for him, "It depends on when, you know. If it's first inning, two outs, nobody on, you know I'm not going to lie to you, I'm trying to get in the seats. And you know if I strikeout, okay, you know whatever, but if there are guys, runners in scoring position, things like that and you strikeout too, that to me, that's bad."

In 2009, Dunn was rated the worst fielder in the Major Leagues by Ultimate Zone Rating, at −35. After the Nationals moved him to first base midway through the 2009 season, his UZR/150 was −30.8 – the next closest first baseman (over 500 innings) was Victor Martinez, at −9.1. Dunn, for the first time in his career, went into spring training in 2010 as a first baseman. By the All Star Break, his UZR/150 was −1.1, ahead of Albert Pujols, Ryan Howard, Mark Teixeira, and Prince Fielder.

Gregg Doyel of CBS Sports had this to say of Dunn's time with the Reds in comparison with the 2010 Reds team: "It's a different Reds team than the older, beer-bellied softball teams of recent years. Those Reds were Ken Griffey and Adam Dunn lounging on the clubhouse's leather couches, hitting home runs, misplaying balls in the outfield and thinking they had it all figured out, when all they knew how to do was lose."

Position changes
In December 2005, Reds manager Jerry Narron informed the press that, due to the trade of popular first baseman Sean Casey to the Pittsburgh Pirates for left-handed pitcher Dave Williams, Dunn would be moving to first base for the 2006 season. However, with the acquisition of free agent first baseman Scott Hatteberg (who played for the Oakland Athletics in 2005) during spring training and the March 20 trade of outfielder Wily Mo Peña to the Boston Red Sox for right-handed pitcher Bronson Arroyo, the plan to convert Dunn was scrapped. Dunn had mentioned that he would rather not play first base.

After Nick Johnson was traded to the Florida Marlins, Dunn was made the Washington Nationals' everyday first baseman.

During Dunn's tenure with the Chicago White Sox, he mostly played as a designated hitter, sometimes filling in for Paul Konerko at first base in games where Konerko himself played as the DH.

Personal life
Dunn is married and has four children. The family lives in Houston, Texas.

Dunn appeared in the 2013 film Dallas Buyers Club as a bartender; he is also an investor in the film.

See also

 List of Major League Baseball career home run leaders
 List of Major League Baseball leaders in bases on balls

References

External links

1979 births
Living people
American football quarterbacks
American League All-Stars
Arizona Diamondbacks players
Baseball players from Houston
Billings Mustangs players
Chattanooga Lookouts players
Chicago White Sox players
Cincinnati Reds players
Dayton Dragons players
Louisville RiverBats players
Major League Baseball first basemen
Major League Baseball left fielders
National League All-Stars
Oakland Athletics players
Players of American football from Houston
Rockford Reds players
Texas Longhorns football players
Washington Nationals players
World Baseball Classic players of the United States
2009 World Baseball Classic players